Jean de Biencourt de Poutrincourt et de Saint-Just (Jean Biencourt, Baron of Poutrincourt and Saint-Just) (1557–1615) was a member of the French nobility best remembered as a commander of the French colonial empire, one of those responsible for establishing the most successful among early attempts to establish a permanent settlement in the North American territory that became known as Acadia, a region of New France.

Life
Jean de Poutrincourt was born in 1547, the third son of Florimond de Biencourt and Jeanne de Salazar. In 1565 he was given the seigneury of Marsilly-sur-Seine. In 1590 Poutrincourt married Claude Pajot; they had two sons and six daughters.

He made his first voyage to the New World in 1604 as a senior member of the expedition led by Pierre Dugua de Mons that established a colony, first on Saint Croix Island but which moved after one winter to build a new settlement in 1605 at Port-Royal. Because of political opposition at home, de Mons decided to remain in France and appointed Poutrincourt governor of Port Royal in 1606. In addition to the title, de Mons granted him ownership of the land in and around the colony, along with fur-trading privileges and fishing rights. These privileges and rights were confirmed by Henri IV, King of France on February 25, 1606. The inclusion of the fur-trading rights was particularly important to Poutrincourt's fortunes in the early years of the colony. After one successful winter, Port Royal was abandoned in 1607 when support from France was cut off. Poutrincourt again returned to Acadia in 1610, along with his son Charles de Biencourt de Saint-Just, Claude de Saint-Étienne de la Tour and his son Charles de Saint-Étienne de la Tour. Port-Royal was re-established and was successful until destroyed by a British raid in 1613.

Following the destruction of Port-Royal, Poutrincourt returned to a military career in France, where he became a victim of a dynastic dispute between Henri IV's widow, Marie de Medici, and Henri de Bourbon, Prince de Condé. In 1615, Poutrincourt was killed during a battle over possession of the town of Méry, in the Champagne region.

See also

Order of Good Cheer

References 

Governors of Acadia
Barons of France
People of New France
1557 births
1615 deaths
1610s in Canada
People from Annapolis County, Nova Scotia
Pre-Confederation Nova Scotia people